Ivankiv Raion was a raion (district) in Kyiv Oblast of Ukraine. Its administrative center was the urban-type settlement of Ivankiv. The raion was abolished on 18 July 2020 as part of the administrative reform of Ukraine, which reduced the number of raions of Kyiv Oblast to seven. With that change, the area of Ivankiv Raion was merged into Vyshhorod Raion.

Overview
The raion expanded in 1986 after the disestablishment of the Chernobyl Raion due to the Chernobyl disaster. Henceforth Ivankiv Raion administered the former territory of the depopulated region that is majorly part of the zone of alienation and supervised by the State Emergency Service of Ukraine.

Subdivisions
At the time of disestablishment, the raion consisted of one hromada, Ivankiv settlement hromada with the administration in Ivankiv.

Gallery

See also
Pripyat
Chernobyl
Hornostaipil
Dytiatky

References

External links

Former raions of Kyiv Oblast
Chernobyl Exclusion Zone
1923 establishments in Ukraine
Ukrainian raions abolished during the 2020 administrative reform